A FAQ is a list of frequently asked questions.

FAQ may also refer to:

 FAQ (Frequently Asked Questions), a composition by Juan María Solare
 FAQ: Frequently Asked Questions, a 2004 Spanish film
 FAQs (film), a 2005 American film
 F.A.Q., Indian infotainment programme which aired on Pogo TV
 Fitiuta Airport, in American Samoa
 Frieda River Airport, in Papua New Guinea